Marcus Relphorde (born December 1, 1988) is an American professional basketball player for Poitiers Basket 86 of the NM1.

College career
Relphorde played college basketball mostly at the University of Colorado, with the Colorado Buffaloes, from 2009 to 2011.

Professional career
Relphorde began his pro career with Canton Charge in 2011. In December he left the club. Then he signed with LF Basket for the rest of the season.

He moved to the Lithuanian club Naglis Palangos in the beginning of the 2012–2013 season. He next played with the Finish club Salon Vilpas., before joining the Greek club he joined the Israeli powerhouse Maccabi Tel Aviv in 2013 for tryouts. He returned to Salon Vilpas for the rest of the 2013–2014 season.

In June 2014, he signed with Hermine de Nantes Atlantique.

In 2015, he signed with Rethymno Cretan Kings and played there until he was replaced by Rashad Madden in December of the same year.

On May 11, 2017, Relphorde joined Gimnasia Indalo of the Argentine League for the rest of the 2016–17 season.

On June 22, 2017, Relphorde signed with the Israeli team Maccabi Rehovot of the Israeli National League. Relphorde led Rehovot to the 2018 National League Playoffs as the third seed, but they eventually were eliminated by Maccabi Kiryat Gat in the Semifinals.

On July 26, 2018, Relphorde signed a one-year contract extension with Rehovot. In 27 games played during the 2018–19 season, he averaged 20.1 points, 6.5 rebounds, 2.9 assists and 1.1 steals per game.

On August 14, 2019, Relphorde signed with Ironi Kiryat Ata for the 2019–20 season.

The Basketball Tournament (TBT)
In the summers of 2016 and 2017, Relphorde played in The Basketball Tournament on ESPN for Team Colorado (Colorado Alumni).  He competed for the $2 million prize, and for Team Colorado, he averaged 8.0 points per game. As a No. 1 seed in the West Region, Relphorde helped take Team Colorado to the Super 16 Round, but was defeated by Armored Athlete 84–75.

References

External links
RealGM.com Profile
Eurobasket.com Profile
Espn.com Profile
Colorado College Profile 
Sports-Reference College Stats

1988 births
Living people
American expatriate basketball people in Argentina
American expatriate basketball people in France
American expatriate basketball people in Greece
American expatriate basketball people in Hungary
American expatriate basketball people in Israel
American expatriate basketball people in Sweden
American men's basketball players
Basketball players from Chicago
Canton Charge players
Colorado Buffaloes men's basketball players
Falco KC Szombathely players
Gimnasia y Esgrima de Comodoro Rivadavia basketball players
Hapoel Migdal HaEmek B.C. players
Indian Hills Warriors basketball players
Ironi Kiryat Ata players
Maccabi Rehovot B.C. players
Rethymno B.C. players
Saint Louis Billikens men's basketball players
Small forwards